Charles-Jesaja Herrmann (born 8 February 2000) is a German professional footballer who plays as a forward for Dutch club NAC Breda on loan from the Belgian club Kortrijk.

Career
In 2021, Herrmann moved to Belgian side Kortrijk from VfL Wolfsburg in the German Bundesliga, where he said "young players get a lot of opportunities here to develop themselves. I also had proposals from the 2. Bundesliga, but I absolutely wanted to go to Belgium. I immediately noticed how more difficult the preparation is here than in Germany." On 24 July 2021, he debuted for Kortrijk in a 2–0 win over Seraing.

On 14 July 2022, Herrman was loaned to NAC Breda in the Netherlands.

Personal life
Hermann is the son of the Ghanaian former footballer Charles Akonnor.

References

External links
 
 
 

2000 births
German sportspeople of Ghanaian descent
Living people
German footballers
Association football forwards
Germany youth international footballers
VfL Wolfsburg II players
K.V. Kortrijk players
NAC Breda players
Regionalliga players
Belgian Pro League players
German expatriate footballers
German expatriate sportspeople in Belgium
Expatriate footballers in Belgium
German expatriate sportspeople in the Netherlands
Expatriate footballers in the Netherlands
Sportspeople from Kiel